Rubus frondisentis is an uncommon North American species of flowering plant in the rose family. It has been found in Québec and in the northeastern United States (Maine, New Hampshire, Vermont, New York).

The genetics of Rubus is extremely complex, so that it is difficult to decide on which groups should be recognized as species. There are many rare species with limited ranges such as this. Further study is suggested to clarify the taxonomy. Some studies have suggested that R. frondisentis may have originated as a hybrid between R. allegheniensis and R. setosus.

References

frondisentis
Plants described in 1906
Flora of Quebec
Flora of the Northeastern United States
Flora without expected TNC conservation status